Erika Dawn Krouse (born March 28, 1969) is an American novelist and short story writer. She is the author of two books of fiction, and her short stories have appeared in The New Yorker, The Atlantic, and Literary magazines, including Ploughshares, Glimmer Train, and Story.

Early life and education
Krouse was born in Yonkers, New York, and grew up on the East Coast and Tokyo. She graduated with a BA from Grinnell College in 1991, and earned an MA from the University of Colorado in 1996.

Career
She began her writing career in poetry, and then switched to fiction because, as she reported in an interview, "I was an awful poet."

Krouse's short story collection, Come Up and See Me Sometime (Scribner, 2001), won the Paterson Prize, was translated into six languages, was a New York Times Notable book of the year, and was described by New York Times Book Review critic Maria Russo as "[leaving] us with a feeling of unbounded, exhilarating possibility." Her novel, Contenders, was published in 2015 (Rare Bird Books).

Krouse served as a fiction judge for the 2005 Colorado Book Award and has reviewed for the New York Times Book Review. Her fiction and essays have appeared in numerous anthologies. Krouse currently lives in Boulder, Colorado, teaches fiction writing at the Lighthouse Writers Workshop, and works part-time as a private investigator.

Awards and honors 
 Amtrak Residency (2014–15).
 Paterson Fiction Prize (2001), for Come Up and See Me Sometime
 Tennessee Williams Scholarship in Fiction, Sewanee Writers' Conference (2000)
 Lauren Husted Scholarship in Fiction, Bread Loaf Writers' Conference (1999). 
 Eve of St. Agnes Award, Negative Capability (1997) 
 Ruth Underhill Award, Denver Women's Press Club (1997)

Bibliography 
 Come Up and See Me Sometime, Scribner (2001)
 Contenders, Rare Bird Books (2015)
 Tell Me Everything: The Story of a Private Investigation, Flatiron Books (2022)

References

External links 
 Official Website

1969 births
Living people
American women novelists
American women short story writers
American short story writers
Grinnell College alumni
University of Colorado Boulder alumni
21st-century American women